Music from Another Room is an EP recorded by Greensburg, Pennsylvania indie rock band The Juliana Theory, released on October 23, 2001 on Tooth & Nail Records.

Track listing
"This Is the End of Your Life" - 5:53
"Moments..." - 4:11
"In a Fraction" - 1:40
"Liability" - 5:23
"Breathing by Wires" - 3:51
"Piano Song" - 6:33

References

2001 EPs
The Juliana Theory albums
Tooth & Nail Records EPs